Friends and Lovers (also known as Paul Sand in Friends and Lovers) is an American sitcom starring Paul Sand which centers on a musician in Boston, Massachusetts, and his personal relationships. It was Sand's only starring role in a television series. The show aired from September 14, 1974, to January 4, 1975.

Cast
 Paul Sand: Robert Dreyfuss
 Michael Pataki: Charlie Dreyfuss
 Penny Marshall: Janice Dreyfuss
 Dick Wesson: Jack Riordan
 Steve Landesberg: Fred Meyerbach
 Craig Richard Nelson: Mason Woodruff
 Jack Gilford: Ben Dreyfuss
 Jan Miner: Marge Dreyfuss

Synopsis

Robert Dreyfuss is a young bachelor and double-bass player who returns to Boston after living in Denver, Colorado, for three years and wins a job playing with the Boston Symphony Orchestra. He is a romantic who falls in love easily with the women he meets, but he has little luck with them because he is shy, passive, dour-faced, and tends to say the wrong things at the wrong time. In sharp contrast, his older brother Charlie is aggressive, loud, physically fit, and athletic. Charlie is protective of Robert, while Charlie's affection-starved wife Janice constantly mocks Robert for his romantic failures, and Robert often gets caught in the middle of the arguments to which Charlie and Janice are prone. Charlie and Janice have a three-year-old son named Brendan who is mentioned in the first episode, but Brendan never appears in the show and is never discussed in any other episode. Ben and Marge are Robert's and Charlie's parents.
In the orchestra, Robert makes friends with an Austrian violinist, Fred Meyerbach, who has a strained relationship with his father. They must deal with the young, sarcastic, and overweight conductor, Mason Woodruff, and the antagonistic orchestra manager, Jack Riordan.

Production

Paul Sand was a rising star – he had won a Tony Award on Broadway and received good reviews for his  appearances on The Carol Burnett Show and The Mary Tyler Moore Show –  when MTM Enterprises decided to give him his own situation comedy in 1974. In order to give the show the maximum possible exposure to new viewers, CBS aired Friends and Lovers on Saturday at 8:30 p.m. between two blockbuster hit situation comedies, All in the Family at 8:00 p.m. and The Mary Tyler Moore Show at 9:00 p.m. – arguably the best time slot for a new series in the autumn of 1974. The show also received much publicity, touted as the "sleeper" hit of the fall 1974 season. 

James L. Brooks and Allan Burns created and were the executive producers of the show. Writers included Linda Bloodworth-Thomason, Gordon Farr, Lowell Ganz, Steve Gordon, Andrew Johnson, Monica Mcgowan Johnson, Arnold Kane, Allan Leicht, Coleman Mitchell, Phil Mishkin, Geoffrey Neigher, Mary Kay Place, Steve Pritzker, and Bud Wiser. Episode directors were Peter Bonerz, Bob Claver, Tim Kiley, Robert Moore, Alan Rafkin, and Jay Sandrich. 

The show was filmed in color before a studio audience.

Episodes

Cancellation

Some critics expressed disappointment in Friends and Lovers – the Boston Herald Americans Anthony La Camera called it "a downright disappointment" and the Boston Globes Percy Shain said it was "mundane and average, with few laughs"  – but others gave it more favorable reviews. The premiere episode on September 14, 1974, was the 14th-most-watched show of the week, and during its run the show had good ratings – for example, a 36 share in early October 1974 – and was the 25th most-viewed television show of the season. However, its ratings paled in comparison to those of the shows before and after it; it lost viewers from All in the Family, which had a 51 share in early October 1974, and network executives believed that it did not provide a good lead-in audience for The Mary Tyler Moore Show, viewership of which fell from previous seasons to a 39 share by early October 1974.  Especially given the high hopes the network had had for the show, it was considered a ratings disappointment for its highly advantageous time slot and, in fact, one of the bigger disappointments of the fall 1974 season.

CBS cancelled the show after only 15 episodes, the last of which was broadcast on January 4, 1975. Along with The Texas Wheelers, Friends and Lovers was one of the first two MTM Enterprises shows ever to be cancelled.

In January 1975, two weeks after it last aired, Friends and Lovers was replaced in its time slot by a new show, The Jeffersons. A better fit for CBS's Saturday-evening line-up, The Jeffersons was a major hit which aired in first-run production for the next ten years.

References

Leszczak, Bob. Single Season Sitcoms, 1948–1979. Jefferson, North Carolina: McFarland and Publishers, Inc., 2012. .

External links
 
 

CBS original programming
1974 American television series debuts
1975 American television series endings
1970s American sitcoms
English-language television shows
Television shows set in Boston
Television series created by James L. Brooks
Television series created by Allan Burns
Television series by MTM Enterprises